In mathematics, the Ernst equation is an integrable non-linear partial differential equation, named after the American physicist .

The Ernst equation

The equation reads:

For its Lax pair and other features see e.g.  and references therein.

Usage
The Ernst equation is employed in order to produce the exact solutions of the Einstein's equations in the general theory of relativity.

References 

Partial differential equations
General relativity
Integrable systems